Commander G. Bedu-Addo was a Ghanaian naval personnel and served in the Ghana Navy. He served as Chief of Naval Staff of the Ghana Navy from August 1974 to July 1975.

References

Ghanaian military personnel
Ghana Navy personnel
Chiefs of Naval Staff (Ghana)